Coleophora discomaculella is a moth of the family Coleophoridae. It is found on the Canary Islands (Tenerife, Fuerteventura), Iran, Turkmenistan and Afghanistan.

In Turkmenistan, larvae have been reared from cases on the seeds of Atriplex ornate.

References

discomaculella
Moths described in 1967
Moths of Africa
Moths of Asia